Parikian is a surname of Armenian origin.

People
 Diana Parikian (1926–2012), British antiquarian bookseller
 Manoug Parikian (1920–1987), British concert violinist and violin professor of Armenian descent
 Meghrig Parikian (1968-2021), Bishop in the Armenian Apostolic Church

References

Surnames